Taybola is the rural locality (a Station) in Kolsky District of Murmansk Oblast, Russia. The village is located beyond the Arctic circle, on the Kola Peninsula. Located at a height of 78 m above sea level.

References

Rural localities in Murmansk Oblast